Impa Armond Kasanganay (born January 17, 1994) is an American mixed martial artist who competes in the Light heavyweight division of Professional Fighters League (PFL). He formerly competed in the Welterweight and Middleweight divisions of Ultimate Fighting Championship (UFC).

Background
Born to Congolese immigrants, Kasanganay started his athletic career playing football, going on scholarship to Lenoir-Rhyne University in 2016, then turning his attention to the cage. During the beginnings of his MMA career, Impa worked as an accountant and holds three degrees, an associate degree in Business Administration and accounting, a Bachelor's in Accounting and a Bachelor's in Finance.

Mixed martial arts career

Early career
Making his MMA debut at 864 Fighting Championship, Impa won his first bout via split decision against Garett Fosdyck. Kasanganay would go on to win his next 4 bouts on the regional scene, defeating Dahlen Willson at Island Fights 53 by unanimous decision, tapping out John Lewis in the first round at Island Fights 54, submitting Roger Pratcher via rear-naked choke in the first round at KOTC Rumble On The River 2, and then finally defeating Devorious Tubbs via split decision in his one and only outing with Legacy Fighting Alliance at LFA 71 on July 12, 2019.

Dana White’s Contender Series
Kasanganay was invited to Dana White's Contender Series 26 on August 27, 2019, where he defeated Kailan Hill via unanimous decision.

After not gaining a UFC contract on his first try, Impa was invited back to Dana White's Contender Series 28 on August 11, 2020, where he defeated Anthony Adams via unanimous decision. With the win, he received a UFC contract.

Ultimate Fighting Championship
Kasanganay made his UFC debut against Maki Pitolo on August 29, 2020, at UFC Fight Night: Smith vs. Rakić. He won the fight via unanimous decision.

Kasanganay, as a replacement Abu Azaitar, faced Joaquin Buckley on October 11, 2020, at UFC Fight Night: Moraes vs. Sandhagen. Buckley won the fight in spectacular fashion via spinning back kick knockout in the second round.

Kasanganay faced Sasha Palatnikov on April 10, 2021, at UFC on ABC: Vettori vs. Holland. After hurting Palatnikov, he secured a rear naked choke winning the fight via submission in the second round.

Kasanganay faced Carlston Harris on September 18, 2021, at UFC Fight Night 192. He lost the fight via technical knockout in round one.

On December 2, 2021, it was announced that Kasanganay was no longer on the UFC roster.

Post-UFC career
On January 19, 2022, news surfaced that Kasanganay had signed a contract with Eagle Fighting Championship. He faced Raimond Magomedaliev at Eagle FC 46 on March 11, 2022. At weigh-ins, Kasanganay weighed in at 179.2 pounds, 3.2 pounds over the super welterweight non-title limit. The bout proceeded at a catchweight and he was fined a percentage of his purse, which went to Raimond. Kasanganay lost the fight via split decision.

Kasanganay faced Jared Gooden at XMMA 5 on July 23, 2022. He won the fight by a first-round TKO stoppage.

Professional Fighters League 
Kasanganay faced Osama Elseady on March 10, 2023 at PFL Challenger Series 15, winning the bout by TKO at the end of the first round, securring a PFL contract.

Mixed martial arts record

|-
|Win
|align=center|11–3
|Osama Elseady
|TKO (punches)
|PFL Challenger Series 15
|
|align=center|1
|align=center|4:15
|Orlando, Florida, United States
|
|-
|Win
|align=center|10–3
|Jared Gooden
|TKO (punches)
|XMMA 5
|
|align=center|1
|align=center|3:16
|Columbia, South Carolina, United States
|
|-
|Loss
|align=center|9–3
|Raimond Magomedaliev
|Decision (split)
|Eagle FC 46
|
|align=center|3
|align=center|5:00
|Miami, Florida, United States
|
|-
|Loss
|align=center|9–2
|Carlston Harris
|TKO (punches)
|UFC Fight Night: Smith vs. Spann
|
|align=center|1
|align=center|2:38
|Las Vegas, Nevada, United States
|
|-
|Win
|align=center|9–1
|Sasha Palatnikov
|Submission (rear-naked choke)
|UFC on ABC: Vettori vs. Holland
|
|align=center|2
|align=center|0:26
|Las Vegas, Nevada, United States
|
|-
|Loss
|align=center|8–1
|Joaquin Buckley
|KO (spinning back kick)
|UFC Fight Night: Moraes vs. Sandhagen
|
|align=center|2
|align=center|2:03
|Abu Dhabi, United Arab Emirates
|
|-
|Win
|align=center|8–0
|Maki Pitolo
|Decision (unanimous)
|UFC Fight Night: Smith vs. Rakić
|
|align=center|3
|align=center|5:00
|Las Vegas, Nevada, United States
|
|-
|Win
|align=center|7–0
|Anthony Adams
|Decision (unanimous)
|Dana White's Contender Series 28
|
|align=center|3
|align=center|5:00
|Las Vegas, Nevada, United States
|
|-
|Win
|align=center|6–0
|Kailan Hill
|Decision (unanimous)
|Dana White's Contender Series 26
|
|align=center|3
|align=center|5:00
|Las Vegas, Nevada, United States
|
|-
|Win
|align=center|5–0
|Devorious Tubbs
|Decision (split)
|LFA 71
|
|align=center|3
|align=center|5:00
|Atlanta, Georgia, United States
|
|-
|Win
|align=center|4–0
|Roger Pratcher
|Submission (rear-naked choke)
|KOTC: Rumble On The River 2
|
|align=center|1
|align=center|4:30
|North Augusta, South Carolina, United States
|
|-
|Win
|align=center|3–0
|John Lewis
|Submission (verbal)
|Island Fights 54
|
|align=center|1
|align=center|1:58
|Panama City Beach, Florida, United States
|
|-
|Win
|align=center|2–0
|Dahlen Wilson
|Decision (unanimous)
|Island Fights 53
|
|align=center|3
|align=center|5:00
|Fort Walton Beach, Florida, United States
|
|-
|Win
|align=center|1–0
|Garrett Fosdyck
|Decision (split)
|864 Fighting Championship: Showcase MMA
|
|align=center|3
|align=center|5:00
|Johnson City, Tennessee, United States
|

See also 
 List of current PFL fighters
 List of male mixed martial artists

References

External links 
  
 

1994 births
Living people
American male mixed martial artists
American people of Democratic Republic of the Congo descent
Lenoir–Rhyne University alumni
Mixed martial artists from Florida
Middleweight mixed martial artists
Welterweight mixed martial artists
Ultimate Fighting Championship male fighters